Liberia competed at the 2020 Summer Paralympics in Tokyo, Japan, from 24 August to 5 September 2021.

Athletics 

Men's field

Women's field

See also
 Liberia at the 2020 Summer Olympics

References

Nations at the 2020 Summer Paralympics
2021 in Liberian sport
2020